The Mafeje affair refers to anti-government protests by South African students in 1968 in response to a decision of the council of the University of Cape Town (UCT) to rescind anthropologist Archie Mafeje's job offer for a senior lecturer position due to pressure from the South African apartheid government. The protests were followed by a nine-day sit-in at the university's administration building.

Protesters faced intimidation from the government, anti-protestors and fellow Afrikaans students from other universities. The police swiftly squashed support for the sit-in. Students at other universities, including the University of Natal and the University of Witwatersrand, voted in support of the UCT action. However, the government successfully intervened against a sympathy march at Witwatersrand.

Mafeje was never hired, and he left the country afterwards and did not return until 2000. After his death, UCT apologised to him and his family and renamed the main room where the sit-in was held in his honour.

Background 
Archie Mafeje (1936–2007) enrolled at the University of Cape Town (UCT) in 1957, joining a minority of less than twenty non-white students on a campus of five thousand. At UCT, he initially enrolled for a Bachelor of Science (BSc) in biology, but failed to pass the required courses. He then switched to social anthropology in 1959. In 1960, he completed a Bachelor of Arts in urban sociology with honours, followed by a Master of Arts (MA) with distinction in political anthropology, before leaving the university in 1963.

Mafeje then moved to the UK initially as a research assistant at the University of Cambridge after being recommended by Monica Wilson (his MA supervisor), but then completed a Doctor of Philosophy under Audrey Richards at King's College, University of Cambridge, in the late 1960s.

Mafeje sought to return to UCT and applied for a senior lecturer post that UCT widely advertised in August 1967. He was unanimously offered a post as senior lecturer of social anthropology by the UCT Council. By law, the UCT could only admit white students unless suitable courses were not available at black universities, but the law did not explicitly bar UCT from hiring non-white faculty.

UCT rescinds Mafeje's offer 

Mafeje was scheduled to start in May 1968, but the UCT Council decided to withdraw Mafeje's employment offer because the Government threatened to cut funding and impose sanctions on UCT should it appoint him. The Minister of National Education, Senator Jan de Klerk, told UCT Council about thegovernment's intense displeasure at the decision to appoint an African, which is tantamount to flouting the accepted traditional outlook of South Africa. Should your Council disregard my appeal and give effect to this decision, the government will not hesitate in taking such action as it may deem fit to ensure that the tradition referred to above is observed.Being aware of the significant number of Jewish students at UCT, the South African government went to the extent of reminding these students that the government had recently loosened the laws to allow them to send money to Israel during the 1967 war, and threatened to reverse the law.

Students' backlash and sit-in 

The Council decision angered UCT's students and led to protests to pressure the council to reverse the decision. On 15 August 1968, Duncan Innes (National Union of South African Students president) and Raphie Kaplinsky (from Radical Society), among other students, organised a mass meeting that surrounded Jameson Hall (today's Sarah Baartman Hall) with over 1,000 students, before marching and occupying the Bremner Building for a sit-in in the UCT Council/Senate meeting room. The students demanded Mafeje be reinstated, declared 20 August Mafeje Day, and petitioned for measures to be put in place to protect academic freedom.

The sit-in lasted for nine days, with participation from approximately 600 students, despite intimidation and counter-protests. These intimidations were in the form of smoke bombs, a false bomb threat, shots being fired at the doors, Afrikaans students from Stellenbosch University (fifty kilometres away) being sent to beat the students at the sit-in, and Prime Minister John Vorster calling the protest leaders and threatening them. Intimidation did not result in casualties but scared away potential supporters. Students at other universities, including the University of Natal and the University of Witwatersrand, voted for full support of UCT student action and staged demonstrations in solidarity. On 19 August Vorster successfully intervened against the University of Witwatersrand's sympathy march. The next day Afrikaans students from Pretoria University forcibly shaved the heads of Witwatersrand students.

The sit-in gained international coverage and was considered part of the global protests of 1968 that received support from students mounting barricades in Paris and London. However, the protest in Cape Town crumbled when counter-protestors stormed the Bremner Building with weapons and dogs while the photos of some of the protestors were passed around to create targets for the counter-protestors. The National Union of Students called an end to the sit-in on 23 August, the protest's ninth day, as the protest eventually died down. Maurice Pope, Dean of the Faculty of Humanities, resigned and left South Africa in protest.

Aftermath

Apartheid government retaliation 
The Security Police began acting against the student protest organisers under the Riotous Assemblies Act of 1956. Some were convicted by magistrates but later acquitted on appeal. Passports were withdrawn from Duncan Innes (NUSAS president) and Raphie Kaplinsky, but they managed to flee the country. One executive member and the vice president of NUSAS were instructed to depart from South Africa before the end of 1968. Both were Rhodesians enrolled in universities in South Africa. Police officers questioned the Rhodes University Student Union's president, who was later informed that his citizenship had been revoked.

Student reaction 
Martin Plaut, BBC Africa Editor and one of the students to participate in the sit-in, said it was not a failure as it refuted the government's assertion that all white people backed its discriminatory policies and said that many of those who participated in the sit-in actively participated in later movements that led to the end of apartheid. 

Students who participated in the sit-in later insisted that they had never met Mafeje and never sought to learn what had become of him. Lungisile Ntsebeza asserts that, in the eyes of the students, the Mafeje affair was not about Mafeje, the individual, but rather about academic freedom and the autonomy of universities.

UCT council response 
UCT Council argued that they were "coerced" and "duressed" by the government, and complying with the government's request meant that they retained the theoretical right to hire non-white academics. However, until 1980, UCT did not appoint another black person. In Mafeje's honour, UCT created the Academic Freedom Research Award, which was not awarded to anyone, and erected a plaque acknowledging that the government had restricted the university's authority to choose its academics.

Mafeje and UCT relationship afterwards 
Shortly thereafter the protests, Mafeje left South Africa to pursue a career abroad. During the negotiations to end apartheid in the early 1990s, UCT offered Mafeje his 1968 senior lecturer position back on a one-year contract, but he declined the position as he was already a well-established professor. Mafeje said he found the offer "most demeaning". In 1994, Mafeje applied for the A.C. Jordan Chair in African Studies at UCT, but his application was rejected as he was deemed "unsuitable for the position". Mahmood Mamdani, an Indian-born Ugandan professor, was appointed instead. He left after having disagreements with the administration on his draft syllabus of a foundation course on Africa called Problematizing Africa. This was dubbed the Mamdani affair.

UCT apologising 
In 2002, UCT Vice-Chancellor  Njabulo Ndebele re-opened the matter of the Mafeje affair. In 2003, UCT officially apologised to Mafeje and offered him an honorary doctorate, but he did not respond to UCT's offer. Mafeje died in 2007.

In 2008, on the incident's 40th anniversary, UCT formally apologised to Mafeje's family. In a citation, emeritus professor Francis Wilson wrote:This then is the man, armed with a Cambridge PhD and a classic published urban study, whose appointment as a senior lecturer was rescinded by the university Council after pressure from the apartheid government in 1968. This is also the man for whom in the early 1990s we (and I include myself) at UCT all failed to provide the appropriate space to enable him to come home to teach and write as he so badly wanted to do.Mafeje's family accepted the apology. UCT posthumously awarded him an honorary doctorate in Social Science, established a scholarship in his honour, and renamed the sit-in meeting room in the Bremner Building the Mafeje Room with a plaque honouring Mafeje, that now presides in front of the Senate meeting room that the protestors held throughout their action. UCT also established the Archie Mafeje Chair in Critical and Decolonial Humanities.

UCT alumni commemorated the 40th and 50th (golden) anniversary of the sit-in.

Notes

References 

1968 protests
University of Cape Town
Student protests in South Africa
1968 in South Africa
Protests in South Africa
Higher education in South Africa
History of South Africa
Nonviolent occupation
Nonviolent resistance movements
Political riots
Progressivism in South Africa